The Royal Air Force Chaplains Branch provides military chaplains for the Royal Air Force of the United Kingdom.

Mission
The Mission of the Royal Air Force Chaplains Branch is to serve the RAF Community through: Prayer, Presence and Proclamation. The motto of the branch Ministrare Non Ministrari translates as ..To serve, not to be served and is derived from Mark chapter 10: verse 45.

History
The Reverend Harry Viener was invested as the first Chaplain-in-Chief on 11 October 1918 with the Chaplaincy branch officially established in December 1918. Reverend Viener had been a Naval Chaplain and was 'lent' to the Air Force by the Admiralty. A Chaplaincy school was established at Magdalene College, Cambridge University in November 1943 with the motto of 'Truth'. The Chaplaincy School was moved to Dowdeswell Court in Gloucestershire in February 1945. Thereafter it moved to Amport House in Hampshire in December 1961. In September 2016, the Ministry of Defence announced that Amport House would be put up for sale as part of a programme of defence estate rationalisation. A Better Defence Estate, published in November 2016, indicated that the Armed Forces Chaplaincy would close by 2020, which it subsequently did, to be relocated to Shrivenham, near Swindon.

Training
RAF chaplains and candidates receive training at the Armed Forces Chaplaincy Centre, this was located at Amport House until 2020.

Endorsing authorities
To serve in the Chaplains Branch, chaplains and candidates must be endorsed by a religious body. RAF commissioned chaplains are accepted from the various Christian denominations. The British military forces are also served by "tri-service chaplains" from other world faiths, including Buddhist, Hindu, Muslim, and Sikh. The RAF also has an honorary Jewish chaplain, Rabbi Malcolm Weisman, who holds the position of Senior Jewish Chaplain to HM Forces. In 2018, the first Sikh and Muslim military chaplains to join the British armed forces passed out from the Royal Air Force College Cranwell to join the RAF Chaplain's Branch.

Noncombatant status
See:

Chaplain-in-Chief

The RAF Chaplains Branch is led by a Chaplain-in-Chief. Harry Viener was the first Chaplain-in-Chief. When the Chaplain-in-Chief is an Anglican, he or she is also the Archdeacon for the Royal Air Force – otherwise, the most senior Anglican chaplain takes that title along with that of Principal Anglican Chaplain.

11 October 1918 – 1926: Harry Viener
25 October 1926 – 1930: Robert Hanson
11 December 1930 – 11 December 1933: Sidney Clarke
11 December 1933 – 10 April 1940: James Walkey
10 April 1940 – 1944: Maurice Edwards
1944–1949: John Jagoe
31 March 1949 – 1953: Leslie Wright
17 April 1953 – 1959: Alan Giles
19 March 1959 – 1965: Francis Cocks (first Archdeacon for the RAF)
13 March 1965 – 1969 Wilfred Payton
14 March 1969 – 1973: Leonard Ashton
3 June 1973 – 1980: Hewitt Wilson
28 June 1980 – 1983 Herbert Stuart
1983–1988: Glyndwr Renowden
30 June 1988 – 1991: Brian Halfpenny
26 July 1991 – 1995: Brian Lucas
26 August 1995 – 1998: Robin Turner
1998–2001: Peter Bishop
21 September 2001 – 2006: Ron Hesketh
20062009: Peter Mills (Church of Scotland)
Archdeacons for the Royal Air Force:
2006 onwards: Ray Pentland
1 October 2009July 2014 (ret.): Ray Pentland
July 2014July 2018: Jonathan Chaffey
July 20182022 (ret.): John Ellis
2022present: Giles Legood

World faith chaplains
The Royal Air Force Chaplains Branch has 5 world faith chaplains as of October 2021:

Flt Lt. Mandeep Kaur (Sikh)
Mr Krishan Attri (Hindu)
Sqn Ldr. Imam Ali Omar (Muslim)
Dr Sunil Kariyakarawana (Buddhist)
Rabbi Reuben Livingstone CF (Jewish)

Central Church of the Royal Air Force
St Clement Danes Church is the Central Church of the Royal Air Force located in the City of Westminster, London.  For generations, members of the Royal Air Force family have enjoyed services of Holy Matrimony and Baptisms. Memorial and funeral serves have taken special place. These remain a strong feature today. The church holds the Books of Remembrance to all those who have died in service in the Royal Air Force. The Friends of St Clement Danes support the work and ministry of the Central Church of the Royal Air Force. The Friend’s Patron-in-Chief is Prince Richard, Duke of Gloucester. The Resident Chaplain is The Reverend Mark Perry   2022 - present

Gallery

See also

RAF Chapel
Royal Army Chaplains' Department
Royal Navy Chaplaincy Service
Bishop to the Forces (Anglican)
Bishopric of the Forces (Roman Catholic)

Chaplain
:Category:Royal Air Force chaplains

Footnotes

Bibliography

External links
RAF Chaplains official website
Careers: Jobs: Chaplain. RAF Careers official website
RAF MOD St Clement Danes Church. RAF MOD official website for St Clement Danes 
St Clement Danes Church. RAF St Clement Danes official website 

RAF Chaplain
 
Military chaplains
Military in Hampshire
Religion in the military
Religion in the United Kingdom
Military units and formations established in 1918
Test Valley
1918 establishments in the United Kingdom